Lilou Station, is an underground station on Line 1 of Tianjin Metro. The station is located in Jinnan District, Tianjin, China.

Gallery

References

External links

Railway stations in Tianjin
Railway stations in China opened in 2018
Tianjin Metro stations